Barthélémy Kotchy or Barthélémy Kotchy-N'Guessan (Grand-Bassam, 1934 – 19 January 2019) was an Ivorian writer and politician.

He was one of the founders of the Ivorian Popular Front and he was the president of ASCAD from 2008. He died in Abidjan on 19 January 2019, aged 84.

Works 
 1982 : Olifant noir ; suivi de, Chansons africaines
 1984 : La critique sociale dans l'œuvre théâtrale de Bernard Dadié
 1984 : Propos sur la littérature négro-africaine, with Christophe I-Dailly
 1989 : Une lecture africaine de Léon Gontran Damas
 1993 : Aimé Césaire, l'homme et l'œuvre, with Lilyan Kesteloot
 2001 : La correspondance des arts dans la poésie de Senghor : essai

References

1934 births
2019 deaths
Ivorian Popular Front politicians
Ivorian writers
People from Grand-Bassam
Ivorian male writers